In the domain of digital audio, a control surface is a human interface device (HID) which allows the user to control a digital audio workstation or other digital audio application.  Generally, a control surface will contain one or more controls that can be assigned to parameters in the software, allowing tactile control of the software. As digital audio software is complex and can play any number of functions in the audio chain, control surfaces can be used to control many aspects of music production, including virtual instruments, samplers, signal processors, mixers, DJ software, and music sequencers.

Since control surfaces are designed to perform different functions, they vary widely in size, shape and number and type of controls. A basic control surface for mixing resembles a traditional analogue mixing console, featuring faders, knobs (rotary encoders), and buttons that can be assigned to parameters in the software. Other control surfaces are designed to give a musician control over the sequencer while recording, and thus provide transport controls (remote control of record, playback and song position). Control surfaces are often incorporated into MIDI controllers to give the musician more control over an instrument. Control surfaces with motorized faders can read and write mix automation.

The control surface connects to the host computer via many different interfaces. MIDI was the first major interface created for this purpose, although many devices now use USB, FireWire, or Ethernet.

Examples
 Smart AV Tango - A hybrid controller with a 22" touch screen, compatible with major DAWs for MAC & PC.
 M-Audio ProjectMix - Control surface that can control many different applications.
 Mackie Control - Serves a similar purpose as the ProjectMix.

External links 
 An introduction to control surfaces

Audio electronics